This is a summary of 1970 in music in the United Kingdom, including the official charts from that year.

Events 
4 January – The Who drummer Keith Moon fatally runs over his chauffeur with his Bentley while  trying to escape a mob outside a pub. The death is later ruled an accident.
16 January – John Lennon's London art gallery exhibit of lithographs, Bag One, is shut down by Scotland Yard for displaying "erotic lithographs"
26 January – Simon & Garfunkel release their final album together, Bridge Over Troubled Water. It tops the album chart at regular intervals over the next two years, and becomes the best-selling album in Britain during the 1970s.
11 February – The film The Magic Christian, starring Peter Sellers and Ringo Starr, is premiered in New York City. The film's soundtrack album, including Badfinger's "Come and Get It" (written and produced by Paul McCartney), is released on Apple Records.
14 February – The Who records Live at Leeds in Yorkshire, England. 
28 February – Led Zeppelin perform in Copenhagen under the pseudonym The Nobs, to avoid a threatened lawsuit by Count Eva von Zeppelin, descendant of airship designer Ferdinand von Zeppelin.
19 March – David Bowie marries model Angela Barnett.
21 March – British-born singer Dana wins the 15th annual Eurovision Song Contest for Ireland with the song "All Kinds of Everything". 
10 April – Paul McCartney publicly announces the break-up of The Beatles. His first solo album is released 10 days later.
8 May – The Beatles' last album, Let It Be, is released.
16 May – The Who release Live at Leeds which is their first live album. Since its initial reception, Live at Leeds has been cited by several music critics as the best live rock recording of all time.
23/24 May – Hollywood Festival, Newcastle-under-Lyme is staged featuring a line-up including The Grateful Dead, Black Sabbath, Free, and Jose Feliciano. Everyone is completely upstaged by the previously unknown Mungo Jerry, whose debut single "In the Summertime" becomes the best-selling hit of the year.
26–30 August – The Isle of Wight Festival 1970 takes place on East Afton Farm off the coast of England. Some 600,000 people attend the largest rock festival of all time. Artists include Jimi Hendrix, The Who, The Doors, Chicago, Richie Havens, John Sebastian, Joan Baez, Ten Years After, Emerson, Lake & Palmer and Jethro Tull.
17 September – Jimi Hendrix makes his last appearance, with Eric Burdon & War jamming at Ronnie Scotts Club in London.  Hendrix dies the following day from a barbiturate overdose at his London hotel, aged 27.
2 December – first production of Michael Tippett's opera The Knot Garden staged by the Royal Opera House.
28 December – Carl Davis marries actress Jean Boht.

Number ones

Singles

Albums

Year-end charts

Best-selling singles (covering 17 Jan to 19 December 1970)

 "In the Summertime" – Mungo Jerry
 "The Wonder of You" – Elvis Presley
 "Band of Gold" – Freda Payne
 "Spirit in the Sky" – Norman Greenbaum
 "Bridge Over Troubled Water" – Simon and Garfunkel
 "Back Home" – England World Cup Squad
 "All Right Now" – Free
 "Wand'rin' Star" – Lee Marvin
 "Yellow River" – Christie
 "The Tears of a Clown" – Smokey Robinson and The Miracles
 "Love Grows (Where My Rosemary Goes)" – Edison Lighthouse
 "All Kinds of Everything" – Dana
 "Lola" – Kinks
 "Can't Help Falling In Love" – Andy Williams
 "Groovin' With Mr. Bloe" – Mr. Bloe
 "Something" – Shirley Bassey
 "Woodstock" – Matthews Southern Comfort
 "Black Night" – Deep Purple
 "Neanderthal Man" – Hotlegs
 "Cottonfields" – Beach Boys
 "Honey Come Back" – Glen Campbell
 "Question" – The Moody Blues
 "Knock, Knock Who's There?" – Mary Hopkin
 "Sally" – Gerry Monroe
 "Two Little Boys" – Rolf Harris
 "Patches" – Clarence Carter
 "You Can Get It If You Really Want" – Desmond Dekker
 "It's All in the Game" – Four Tops
 "I Hear You Knocking" – Dave Edmunds
 "Voodoo Chile" – The Jimi Hendrix Experience
 "Give Me Just a Little More Time" – Chairmen of the Board
 "Me and My Life" – The Tremeloes
 "Mama Told Me Not to Come" – Three Dog Night
 "Goodbye Sam, Hello Samantha" – Cliff Richard
 "I Want You Back" – The Jackson 5
 "Up Around the Bend" – Creedence Clearwater Revival
 "Paranoid" – Black Sabbath
 "Let's Work Together" – Canned Heat
 "Rainbow" – Marmalade
 "Leaving On a Jet Plane" – Peter, Paul and Mary
 "Montego Bay" – Bobby Bloom
 "Indian Reservation" – Don Fardon
 "Daughter of Darkness" – Tom Jones
 "Everything Is Beautiful" – Ray Stevens
 "Young, Gifted and Black" – Bob and Marcia
 "Let It Be" – The Beatles
 "House of the Rising Sun" – Frijid Pink
 "I Don't Believe in If Anymore" – Roger Whittaker
 "(They Long to Be) Close to You" – The Carpenters
 "Which Way You Goin' Billy?" – Poppy Family

Best-selling albums
The list of the top fifty best-selling albums of 1970 were published in Record Mirror at the end of the year, and later reproduced in the first edition of the BPI Year Book in 1976. However, in 2007 the Official Charts Company published album chart histories for each year from 1956 to 1977, researched by historian Sharon Mawer, and included an updated list of the top ten best-selling albums for each year based on the new research. The updated top ten for 1970 is shown in the table below.

Classical works
 Sir Arthur Bliss – Concerto for Cello and Orchestra
Alun Hoddinott 
Violin Sonata 2
Cello Sonata 1
Daniel Jones – String Trio
William Mathias – Harp Concerto
Stanley Myers – "Cavatina"
Michael Tippett – Songs for Dov
David Wynne – Duo for cello and piano

Opera
Benjamin Britten – Owen Wingrave

Film and incidental music
Frank Cordell – Cromwell, starring Richard Harris and Alec Guinness.
Johnny Douglas – The Railway Children directed by Lionel Jeffries, starring Dinah Sheridan, Jenny Agutter, Sally Thomsett and Bernard Cribbins.
Stanley Myers – 
A Severed Head, starring Ian Holm, Claire Bloom, Lee Remick and Richard Attenborough.
Take a Girl Like You directed by Jonathan Miller, starring Hayley Mills and Oliver Reed.
The Walking Stick – includes "Cavatina" which was later made famous when used in the 1978 film The Deer Hunter.
William Walton – Three Sisters, starring Alan Bates, Laurence Olivier and Joan Plowright.

Musical films
Let It Be (documentary about The Beatles
Scrooge, starring Albert Finney.

Births 
20 January – Mitch Benn, English comedian, singer-songwriter, and guitarist
31 January – Minnie Driver, actress and singer
1 March – Alison Stephens, mandolin player
27 March – Brendan Hill, drummer 
11 April – Delroy Pearson, singer (Five Star)
16 April – Gabrielle, singer
1 May – Bernard Butler, singer and guitarist (Suede)
14 May – Lee Murray, singer and drummer (Let Loose)
19 June – MJ Hibbett, singer-songwriter
22 June – Alan Leach, drummer (Shed Seven)
6 July – Martin Smith, singer-songwriter and guitarist (Delirious?)
10 July – Jason Orange, singer (Take That)
16 July – Lee Baxter, singer (Caught in the Act)
17 July – Mandy Smith, singer
13 July – Julian Wagstaff, composer
11 August – Andy Bell, bassist (Oasis)
14 September – Mark Webber, guitarist (Pulp)
4 October – Andy Parle, drummer (Space)
13 October – Paul Potts, concert tenor
21 October – Tony Mortimer, singer (East 17)
24 October – Eds Chesters, drummer (The Bluetones)
7 November – Neil Hannon, Northern Irish musician (The Divine Comedy)
11 December – Matthew Strachan, composer and singer-songwriter
12 December – David Horne, composer
14 December – Beth Orton, singer-songwriter
29 December – Aled Jones, boy soprano, later baritone

Deaths
26 February – Ethel Leginska, English-American pianist, music teacher, composer and conductor, 84
20 July – Oda Slobodskaya, Russian-born British soprano, 81
29 July – Sir John Barbirolli, conductor, 70
1 September – Alan Styler, operatic baritone, 44
6 September – Louie Pounds, actress and singer, 98
November – J. Murdoch Henderson, fiddler, composer and music critic, 68
18 November – Gavin Gordon, singer, actor and composer, 68
31 December – Cyril Scott, composer and writer, 91
date unknown
Frederic Bayco, organist and composer, 57
Frank Lawes, banjo player and composer, 66
Frederick William Wadely, organist and composer, 88

See also 
 1970 in British radio
 1970 in British television
 1970 in the United Kingdom
 List of British films of 1970

References 

 
British
British music by year